The Thirty-three gods or Tridasha (Sanskrit   "three tens") is a pantheon of Hindu deities, of Vedic origin and a few of later development. The Samhitas, which are the oldest layer of text in Vedas, enumerate 33 devas, either 11 each for the three worlds, or as 12 Adityas, 11 Rudras, 8 Vasus, and 2 Ashvins in the Brahmanas layer of Vedic texts.

List 
The 33 are:
 Eight Vasus (deities of material elements) –  "Sky",  "Earth", Vāyu "Wind", Agni "Fire",  "Stars",   "Water", Sūrya "Sun", Chandra "Moon"
 Twelve Adityas (personified deities) – Vishnu, Aryaman, Indra, Bhaga, Vivasvat, Mitra,  (This list sometimes varies in particulars)
 Eleven Rudras, consisting of Aja, Ekapada, Ahirbudhanya, Tvasta, Rudra, Hara, Sambhu, Trayambaka, Aparjita, Isana and Tribhuvan.
Two Ashvins (or Nāsatyas), twin solar deities.

Variations
The list of Vedic Devas somewhat varies across the manuscripts found in different parts of South Asia, particularly in terms of guides (Aswins) and personified Devas. One list based on Book 2 of Aitereya Brahmana is:
 Devas personified: Indra, Mitra, Aryaman, Bhaga, Vidhata, Vivasvat (Surya),  (Dhatr), Vishnu.
 Devas as abstractions or inner principles: Ānanda (bliss, inner contentment), Vijñāna (knowledge), Manas (mind, thought), Prāṇa (life-force), Vāc (speech), Ātmā (Self within each person), and five manifestations of Rudra/Shiva – Īśāna, Tatpuruṣa, Aghora, Vāmadeva, Sadyojāta
 Devas as forces or principles of nature –  (earth), Agni (fire), Antarikṣa (atmosphere, space), Jal (water), Vāyu (wind),  (sky), Sūrya (sun),  (stars), Soma (moon)
 Devas as guide or creative energy – Vasatkara, Prajāpati

The identity of the 2 Ashvins sometimes varies:

Literature 
The Brihadaranyaka Upanishad describes the existence of these deities with a different lineup:

See also
 Trāyastriṃśa, the Buddhist equivalent

Notes

References

Hindu gods